World Builder is an authoring system for point-and-click adventure games.

World Builder may also refer to:

 World Builder (film), a 2007 short film by Bruce Branit
 World Builder (map editor), a map editor for the Command & Conquer: Generals computer game
 World Builder, a map editor for the Civilization IV computer game
 Bonei Olam (בוני עולם, "Builders of the World"), a Brooklyn, New York-based fertility assistance organization that assists Jewish couples

See also
 Empire Builder (disambiguation)
 Level editor
 World (disambiguation)
 Builder (disambiguation)